George Washington Carver High School  is a four-year public high school in Birmingham, Alabama. It is one of seven high schools in the Birmingham City School System and is named for the American botanist and inventor, George Washington Carver.

History 

Carver's current campus was completed in 2001 on a site that was formerly the North Birmingham Golf Course. It was Birmingham City Schools' first new high school in three decades and cost an estimated $44.5 million.

Athletics 
Carver competes in AHSAA Class 5A athletics and currently fields teams in the following sports:
 Baseball
 Basketball
 Cheerleading
 Football
 Outdoor track and field
 Soccer
 Softball
 Swimming
 Volleyball
 Wrestling
Carver has won three state championships:
 Boys' basketball (1978)
 Boys' track and field (1969)
 Girls' track and field (1993)

Notable alumni
 Issiac Holt, National Football League (NFL) defensive back

References

External links 
 Carver school website

High schools in Birmingham, Alabama
Public high schools in Alabama
Schools in Jefferson County, Alabama
1959 establishments in Alabama
Educational institutions established in 1959